William T. McCarthy (December 5, 1885 – April 6, 1964) was a United States district judge of the United States District Court for the District of Massachusetts.

Education and career

Born in Somerville, Massachusetts, McCarthy received an Artium Baccalaureus degree from College of the Holy Cross in 1905 and a Juris Doctor from Boston University School of Law in 1908. He entered private practice in Boston, Massachusetts in 1908. He was an Alderman for the Town of Somerville from 1911 to 1913. He was an assistant district attorney of Middlesex County, Massachusetts from 1913 to 1915. He was a member of the Somerville School Board from 1920 to 1921. He was an Assistant United States Attorney for the District of Massachusetts from 1934 to 1947. He was the United States Attorney for the District of Massachusetts from 1947 to 1949.

Federal judicial service

McCarthy was nominated by President Harry S. Truman on January 13, 1949, to a seat on the United States District Court for the District of Massachusetts vacated by Judge Arthur Daniel Healey. He was confirmed by the United States Senate on January 31, 1949, and received his commission on February 2, 1949. He assumed senior status on May 31, 1960. McCarthy served in that capacity until his death on April 6, 1964.

References

Sources
 

1885 births
1964 deaths
College of the Holy Cross alumni
Boston University School of Law alumni
Massachusetts city council members
Judges of the United States District Court for the District of Massachusetts
United States district court judges appointed by Harry S. Truman
20th-century American judges
United States Attorneys for the District of Massachusetts